Racism in United States college fraternities and sororities ("Greek life") has been linked to the experience of microaggressions, fewer opportunities to use the networking system built into Greek life, and harmful stereotypes.  This fuels the experiences of people of color throughout their lives in various academic, work, and personal spaces, including Greek Life Organizations (GLOs). Many have argued that through the creation of these organizations, there has been a legacy of racism, which has fueled the elitist structure that has negatively impacted people of color the most.

History 

Greek life has a long history of policies that have contributed to racism and lack of diversity in many Greek organizations, where fraternities are viewed as a place that "breeds snobbery, incubates hate, fosters foppery, reduces favoritism, and crushes individuality". In resistance to racism in GLOs, as far back as 1906, Black GLOs were founded. Members of other racial groups began to form their own fraternities and sororities. In 1912, the first Latino fraternity, Sigma Iota, was founded at Louisiana State University; in 1931, it merged to form Phi Iota Alpha, the oldest Latino fraternity.  In 1948, the first MGLO fraternity was founded at the University of Toledo and the first Latina sorority were founded in 1975. In 1981, the first MGLO sorority was founded at Rutgers University. More MGLOs were founded “nationally and locally” the following years to continue as a “foundation transcending racial, national, and religious differences”. Soon after, Multicultural Greek Councils were formed to govern affiliated MGLOs, both national or local fraternities and sororities.

By the end of the 1960s, White Greek Life Organizations (WGLOs) eliminated official policies that prohibited race-based membership. However abolishing these clauses did not prevent GLOs from using other means of maintaining racist and exclusive practices. Following the elimination of explicitly racist policies, Greek organizations sustained their racist practices through more informal means of discrimination. This is often seen through forms of de facto segregation, white supremacist overtones at Greek parties and events, mock “slave auctions”, and accounts of white fraternity members dressing in “blackface”. For instance, several white fraternities have been found building homecoming floats with racist themes, staging racist skits, and holding parties with racist themes. Furthermore, in terms of de facto segregation, despite eliminating racially exclusionary policies, many white Greek life organizations failed to actively pursue and promote new members of color. Therefore, lack of diversity within Greek Life organizations remains relatively unchanged.

People of color continue to feel marginalized within these organizations. Because the foundations of Greek life were built on biased practices, WGLOs continue to provide a structure that enforces euro-centrism and conformity among its members. Although Greek systems today are not divided into separate racial categories, GLOs are still viewed as the desirable option when it comes to seeking membership, because they historically have had more access to resources and networking opportunities that people in non-white GLOs do not. At the present moment, WGLOs are pressured to integrate people of color, but they do so under conditions that they set themselves. This puts those people of color wanting to join in positions where they both have to “perform” and embrace their ethnic differences, while trying to assimilate to traditional practices that encourage homogeneity.

Contemporary incidents 

People of color face wide-ranging forms of discrimination in Greek life. From simple acts of discrimination such as racial slurs being thrown around in songs, to hazing-related incidents, racism is still prevalent in Greek life. Members of color see white peers use blackface as a form of humor and they are more harshly judged when they do not participate in events that are incongruent with their personal beliefs. The use of blackface as a form of humor or entertainment has a lasting legacy in all aspects of American society, including Greek Life. This legacy stretches from Mark Twain’s fondness for shows with performers in blackface to current Halloween costumes. Another example of the racialized experiences that members of color face are when Hispanic members of WGLOs feel as though they are being labeled as lazy if they chose not to participate in networking opportunities. Labels like these are products of racial stereotypes about Hispanic people. It is important to note that Greek organizations did not develop this exclusivity over time, they were founded on it.

GLOs for decades have formed multicultural and ethnically specific councils and organizations, in an attempt to control their own organizations. The purpose of Multicultural Greek Life Organizations (MGLOs) is to promote cultural group identity and to create spaces that are more conducive to the advancement of cultural interest groups, including Asian Americans and Latin Americans.  For example, in 1930, the National Pan-Hellenic Council was formed to further the interest of black fraternities and sororities during an era when the white fraternities and sororities practiced racial and religious segregation.

In 2020, college students and alumni across the nation started "Abolish Greek Life" Instagram accounts discussing how the Greek system at their respective colleges promote racism, anti-semitism, xenophobia, homophobia, transphobia, sexism, classism, elitism, exploitation, alcohol abuse, drug abuse, and rape culture.  People following and promoting these accounts want to abolish Greek life because they feel every attempt to reform it has failed. Sororities and Fraternities nationwide are finally opening their ears to hear what the public has to say, and are working towards reform. Sororities are making ground with new inclusivity positions, reaching back to the roots upon which they were founded.

Greek organizations associated with racist incidents 
 Kappa Gamma, Gallaudet University
 Sigma Alpha Epsilon, University of Oklahoma
 Kappa Kappa Gamma, University of New Mexico
 Alpha Chi Rho, Syracuse University was alleged, but is contested in civil court.

See also
Cultural interest fraternities and sororities
The Machine (social group)

External links 

 "Fraternities, Sororities, and Racism" (Livia Gershon, JSTOR Daily, March 2015)
 "Greek life is losing members. Here's why." (Marygam Gamar, Vox, April 2021)
 "Why Historically-White Sororities and Fraternities Are Racially Problematic in US Universities" (Royal Historical Society blog, July 2021)
 "‘SNAPPED’ season two pulls back the curtain on sorority recruitment" (Khushboo Rathore, The Diamondback, February 2022)

References 

Fraternities and sororities in the United States
Racism in the United States
Academic culture